Kentucky Route 321 (KY 321) originates at a junction with U.S. Highway 23 north of Paintsville, Kentucky in Johnson County, Kentucky, United States. The route continues through Johnson County to terminate at KY 1428 in Prestonsburg in Floyd County.

Route description

Floyd County
KY 321 begins at an intersection with KY 1428 in Prestonburg, Floyd County, heading north on North Lake Drive, a three-lane road with a center left-turn lane. The road passes businesses with some nearby woodland and homes. The route passes to the east of Prestonburg Community College and narrows to a two-lane unnamed road, curving northeast through woods and running to the east of Levisa Fork. KY 321 passes more rural development and intersects the western terminus of KY 3024. The road turns to the north and winds through forested areas with occasional residential development. The route curves to the northwest and comes to an intersection with KY 3. At this point, KY 321 turns east to form a concurrency with KY 3, passing through more rural areas with some development including Highlands Regional Medical Center. The road forms a short concurrency with KY 3051 before it curves to the north. KY 3 splits by heading to the east near Auxier. KY 321 continues northwest through forests and crosses into Johnson County.

Johnson County
In Johnson County, the road intersects the southern terminus of KY 2381 before it passes to the northeast of Paintsville-Prestonsburg Combs Field, where it intersects KY 2559. The route heads north into residential areas and curves to the northeast. KY 321 continues north into dense forests, where it makes a turn to the west. The road heads northwest and intersects the southern terminus of KY 1107 before it crosses Levisa Fork and a CSX railroad line. The route curves north and gains a second northbound lane as it passes through wooded areas of development. KY 321 narrows back to two lanes and turns northwest to come to a grade-separated junction with KY 1428. The road runs through more forested areas and curves to the north, where it gains a second northbound lane. The route heads northeast, where the northbound direction narrows back to one lane and the southbound direction becomes two lanes. KY 321 turns to the north before it heads northwest into Paintsville. At this point, the road becomes four lanes total and passes businesses. The route curves to the west and narrows to two lanes, intersecting the southern terminus of KY 321 Bus. KY 321 heads into wooded areas and curves to the north, coming to a junction with the western terminus of KY 2378. The road continues past commercial development and heads northwest, gaining a center left-turn lane and passing several shopping centers. The route crosses Paint Creek and intersects KY 40.  KY 321 continues north as a four-lane divided highway through wooded areas with some development and comes to its northern terminus at US 23.

Major intersections

KY 321 Business

Kentucky Route 321 Business (KY 321 Bus.) is a business route of KY 321 in Paintsville. The route begins at KY 321 by heading north as a two-lane undivided road. KY 321 Bus. immediately intersects the western terminus of KY 2333 and becomes Broadway. The road passes by businesses and crosses Paint Creek, where the name changes to College Street. The business route heads through the downtown area and intersects the western terminus of KY 2561 before it comes to its northern terminus at KY 40.

References

Further reading
 
 

0321
0321
Transportation in Floyd County, Kentucky